The third Mohawk (YT‑17), later renamed YT-17 and YTL-17, was a tug that served in the United States Navy from 1898 to 1946.

Mohawk was built as the civilian tug T. P. Fowler in 1893 by T. S. Marval and Company, Newburgh, New York. She was acquired by the U.S. Navy from Cornell Steamboat Company on 23 April 1898 for service in the Spanish–American War and assigned to the 5th Naval District.

Mohawk operated in and around Norfolk Navy Yard, Norfolk, Virginia, for nearly half a century, making several voyages a year to naval installations throughout the Potomac River and Chesapeake Bay area, serving the fleet by towing barges and aiding naval vessels.

Designated YT‑17 in 1920, her name was changed from Mohawk to YT-17 in 1942. YT‑17 was renamed YTL‑17 in 1944 and continued service at Norfolk through the end of World War II.

YTL-17 was turned over to the War Shipping Administration for disposal on 1 October 1946 and sold to W. S. Sanders, Norfolk, Va., in 1948. She was subsequently resold to H. B. Stone of Wilmington, North Carolina. She was declared derelict in 1969 and sunk as an artificial reef off Wrightsville Beach, North Carolina, in 1970.

References
 
 YTL-17 at Navsource.org

Tugs of the United States Navy
Ships built in Newburgh, New York
1893 ships
World War II auxiliary ships of the United States
World War I auxiliary ships of the United States
Spanish–American War auxiliary ships of the United States
Ships sunk as artificial reefs
Maritime incidents in 1970